For other roads with the same name see List of A21 roads.

The A21 is a trunk road in Southern England, one of several which connect London and various commuter towns to the south coast. It provides a link to Hastings, East Sussex and parts of Kent. Half of the distance covered is over gently undulating terrain, with some hills and bends. Often traffic is slow-moving, particularly on weekdays on the short single carriageway stretches; and in summer with holiday traffic.
Because of this, people have described the A21 as "a joke" and businesspeople have been reported to "hate coming down the A21". There have been many proposals to upgrade parts of the A21 in response to this.

Parts of the A21 follow the historic turnpike roads: for example the section from Sevenoaks to Tunbridge Wells, opened in 1710; other sections of the road were similarly dealt with later in the century. It is also the location of the first wildlife overbridge in the United Kingdom, near Lamberhurst.
The road between the M25 and Hastings is designated a trunk road, and is maintained and managed by Highways England (formerly known as the Highways Agency).

The A21 is used for the  Maydayrun to Hastings in which motorcyclists ride from South London to the Hastings seafront. It claims to be the largest non-organised event in the UK, attracting over 20,000 bikers.

History

Turnpikes
Parts of the A21 follow the turnpike roads: one being the section from Sevenoaks to Tunbridge Wells, opened in 1710; other sections of the road were similarly dealt with later in the century.

A2100 road
South of Johns Cross, the A21 originally followed the present day A2100 road passing Mountfield and heading through Battle and approaching Silverhill via Hollington. The A21 was later rerouted to the east along what was formerly the B2091, A229 and A28.

Upgraded dual-carriageway sections
Sections of the A21 were upgraded to a dual carriageway standard in stages in the 20th century.

Sevenoaks Bypass
The Sevenoaks Bypass opened in 1966.

Tonbridge Bypass
It wasfollowed by the Tonbridge bypass and associated Medway Valley viaduct in July 1971.

Pembury Bypass
The Pembury bypass opened in 1988, followed by the Robertsbridge bypass in 1989.

Lamberhurst Bypass

The Lamberhurst Bypass was opened on 23 March 2005 to a cost of £18 million. The A21 used to have steep inclines into the village and the valley of the River Bewl. Included in the scheme is Britain's first land bridge at Scotney Castle which facilitates safe migration of wild animals over the road. The scheme was constructed by May Gurney who planted 50,000 trees on the new road.

Tonbridge and Pembury Bypass separation road width
Between 1988 and 2017, the Tonbridge bypass and the Pembury bypass were separated by a  section of 7.3m wide single carriageway with no footways or verges. Severe congestion was frequent as this stretch carried an average of 35,000 vehicles each day, significantly higher than its original capacity, and the number of accidents occurring on this road was above the national average. There were proposals to upgrade this section of A21 to a dual carriageway standard following the Pembury bypasses completion, however they were delayed multiple times. In the 2000s, an upgrade scheme was proposed by the Highways Agency, and in 2013 it underwent public enquiry. The scheme layout followed the existing carriageway and involved the construction of a pedestrian and cycle route along its whole length, as well as upgrading the Longfield Road roundabout into a grade-separated Roundabout interchange.  £92million of government money was made available to the scheme in July 2013. Preparatory works started in September 2014, which involved nine hectares of ancient woodland being removed. Trees and shrubs were relocated to adjacent land and nesting boxes were installed to protect endangered species such as the dormouse. 
As a result of the widening of the carriageway a number of buildings were demolished, including a Grade 2 listed 18th century barn. Completion of the scheme was delayed in late 2016 after the discovery of asbestos contamination. The improved road opened in September 2017.

Modern route

Overview
Passing through Catford, Bromley and Farnborough, twenty miles (32 km) from the start of the journey, it reaches the Kent border and the open countryside. At this point, the road becomes a trunk road, a distinction it has held since April 1977. This section is mostly a dual carriageway; but there are a few short stretches of single carriageway, resulting in frequent congestion, especially in peak periods.
Beyond the East Sussex border, the road is entirely single carriageway, sometimes with steep gradients.
Another bypass takes the A21 around the narrow road through Salehurst and Robertsbridge. Immediately before Hastings is the final hill, almost 4 miles (6 km) in length.

London

The A21 starts in Lewisham in London at a junction with the A20 known as "Loampit Vale Junction". From there the road uses various roads in Catford, where the A205 (the South Circular Road) crosses the A21; it runs south east up Bromley Hill to enter the London Borough of Bromley, where there are sections of dual carriageway, on the town's gyratory system (part of which is called Kentish Way) .

Up Masons Hill the road reaches Bromley Common, the first large-scale open space negotiated; briefly, just before Farnborough, the road becomes Hastings Road. The original A21 went through the suburb, the High Street is now the B2158. Until now the road has been in a south-easterly direction, but after Green Street Green it turns eastwards towards the valley of the River Darent, and it is at this point that the road pattern makes a complete change from its original route.

The A21 originally entered Kent here and climbed to the scarp of the North Downs at Polhill, and then descended through Dunton Green and up the valley of the River Darent to Sevenoaks; through the town centre and then down into the Medway valley via Hildenborough to Tonbridge. The London Road at the north of the town is now the B245; it continued through the long High Street, over the many bridges of the river (during which time it was also part of the A26 from Maidstone ). As the road began to climb out of the valley it took a left fork; shortly after this the route of the modern A21 is rejoined.

Knockholt to Castle Hill

Where the new A21 begins, and also where the A224 joins from the north, the road is called the Sevenoaks Road; at Knockholt (Hewitts Roundabout), the road enters Kent near its junction with a spur from the M25 motorway. The A21 actually multiplexes with the M25 and descends the North Downs Scarp here. The M25 then has to use a slip road in the left lane and the A21 takes priority although is still technically a motorway until the junction with the A25 to Sevenoaks and the M26. The oddness of Junction 5 is due to the M26 once being part of the M25.
Before the M25 was built, the A21 was the modern A224 near Polhill and then became the dual carriageway Sevenoaks bypass.

This section of the road is a grade separated dual carriageway with two lanes in each direction (aside from a three lane section northbound climbing Hubbards Hill). The road passes to the west of the town, running through a nearby valley until it meets the A225 and B245 at Morley's Interchange near Sevenoaks Weald. The next section bypasses the original route of the A21 along the B245 through Hildenborough, Tonbridge High Street, and Pembury Road to join the current route near the second A26 junction.

Between Leigh and Haysden the road crosses the River Medway by means of a two-span viaduct. Around this point, the road enters the High Weald Area of Outstanding Natural Beauty. The A21 then meets the two junctions with the A26, providing access to Tonbridge and Southborough.

Castle Hill to Lamberhurst
After the end of the Tonbridge bypass, the A21 climbs Castle Hill as the Pembury Bypass as it reaches the North Farm interchange with the flyover for non-stop traffic. The next junction is with the A264 road to Tunbridge Wells and the A228 to Maidstone. The road later meets the original alignment at an at-grade junction (leaving a brief gap in the central reservation) not long before it meets a double roundabout at Kippings Cross where another section of single carriageway starts.
The next section of A21 is a major bottleneck, being a single carriageway with frequent bends. In October 2005 the "Preferred Route" to upgrade this  section was announced.
However, the scheme has since been suspended.

Lamberhurst to John's Cross

After a junction with the A262, the road returns to a dual carriageway standard along the   Lamberhurst bypass where the A21 skirts to the east of the village on a road through various farms until eventually it gets to Scotney Castle where the dual carriageway ends at a roundabout.

However it has been reduced to one lane in each direction to reduce speeding.
As the dual Carriageway ends, the road enters East Sussex and meets the A268, taking traffic to/from Rye. The A21 then travels through numerous conjoined villages including Hurst Green where it meets the A265 from Heathfield. After a hill descent, the road reaches a roundabout where the Robertsbridge bypass begins, taking traffic away from the main street in the village.
This is built to a single carriageway standard. The road then regains the original route before meeting the A2100 at a roundabout in the hamlet of Johns Cross.

Mountfield to Hastings
After Johns Cross roundabout, the A21 takes a relatively straight, though undulating, journey, through Whatlington and passes Sedlescombe before climbing a four-mile (6.4 km) long hill to enter Hastings where the first junction reached is the Baldslow Interchange where currently the A28, A2100 and B2093 roads all terminate. The A21 then heads through northern Hastings where the road is known as Sedlescombe road North with access to sub-urban streets until eventually it meets the A2101 which heads for the Town Centre. The A21 then enters Silverhill where it gets to a junction which is sometimes a major bottleneck. Afterwards the A2102 heads for St Leonards and the A21 becomes the high street of Bohemia where the road is narrow. The route then heads down with access to various emergency services and then enters the town centre. From here the original A21 cut through the town centre to meet the A259 at a roundabout near Pelham Crescent however since the town centre has been pedestrianised the A21 heads down on the sub-urban streets to the east. The next section of the A21 heads around partly on a one-way system near the railway station and the Priory Quarter business development. From here, the southbound stretch of A21 is reserved for buses only and terminates on the A259.

Junctions

Improvement proposals
Large portions of the A21, through Kent mostly, are dual carriageway with intervening stretches of single carriageway.
There have long been plans are to upgrade some of the remaining stretches of single carriageway to alleviate congestion, safety and accessibility problems in the villages along the route.

Safety is a particular concern because a 2002 report stated that a  section of the A21 south of Flimwell was the most dangerous road in the south east outside London, and the 38th most dangerous in the country, however it has since been overtaken by the A259 between Pevensey and Bexhill-on-Sea.

Kippings Cross to Lamberhurst
When the Pembury bypass ends at Kippings Cross, the next section of A21 is a low quality single carriageway road with several steep gradients across the Weald. There are few major centres of habitation on the road
and limited or no footpaths.
There are many houses next to the route and the road has very frequent bends.
The Kippings Cross to Lamberhurst section has a high accident rate and congestion occurs particularly at peak times.

It is proposed that this section should be turned into a two-lane dual carriageway with footpaths
and is proposed to be completely off-line, although mainly following the existing route, and have
improvements to the A262 roundabout.
The Bypass is said to cost £40 million.

This scheme has since been suspended following the 2010 spending review.

Flimwell to Robertsbridge
Plans have been published for a new road between the southern end of the Flimwell bypass and the beginning of the Robertsbridge bypass. The 5.5-mile (8.9 km) improvement will bypass the villages of Flimwell, Hurst Green and Silver Hill. The improvement will commence at the B2079 junction (Lady Oak Lane) on the short section of existing dual carriageway north of Flimwell and terminate at the roundabout at the northern end of the Robertsbridge Bypass.
Although part of the road will be brought up to a dual carriageway standard, parts will become a "wide single carriageway". This scheme has been postponed until 2015 at the earliest and currently route protection is being lifted.

Baldslow Interchange
Since the Hastings-Bexhill Link Road opened, more traffic has started to use the already congested road from the A2100/A28 to the A21 at Baldslow Interchange, Hastings.
Construction is underway to build a short link road to the A21 south of the interchange and bring more of the A21, from there up past to a new roundabout in an area north of the interchange, to dual carriageway standard.
Another option was to realign the A2100 north of the junction, but this option was less favourable due to environmental concerns.

Further upgrades
Schemes to upgrade the following sections have also been proposed:

Lamberhurst to Flimwell
Robertsbridge to Baldslow

See also
 Great Britain road numbering scheme

References

External links
 UK Roads Portal (WIKI) – A21
 CBRD M25 J5
 Road to Nowhere: A21

Streets in London
Streets in the London Borough of Lewisham
Streets in the London Borough of Bromley
Transport in East Sussex
Roads in Kent
Roads in London
Hastings
Proposed roads in the United Kingdom